The 1937–38 season was Arsenal's 19th consecutive season in the top division of English football. They won the league for the fifth time in eight years, beating Wolverhampton Wanderers by a point with a 5–0 final day victory over Bolton Wanderers. The Gunners had staged a surprise comeback to win the league after being eleventh in November, and went out of the FA Cup at the fifth round stage in February. Ted Drake once again top-scored for the Gunners with eighteen goals in all competition, with 17 of them coming in the league, but an injury to Drake forced manager George Allison to improvise with Eddie Carr up front, but he came to the fore with five goals in the final three games, with Arsenal winning each one.

Results
Arsenal's score comes first

Legend

Football League First Division

Final League table

FA Cup

Arsenal entered the FA Cup in the third round, in which they were drawn to face Bolton Wanderers.

See also

 1937–38 in English football
 List of Arsenal F.C. seasons

References

Arsenal
Arsenal F.C. seasons
English football championship-winning seasons